Kpalbe or Palbe is a town in the Savannah Region of Ghana. It is the capital of the North East Gonja District.

Location
Kpalbe lies south east to Tamale the capital of the Northern Region. Towns to the north are Bung (Gbung) and Chanbulugu. Kwisini and Chandayili are found to the east. Towards the south are JIdanyile, Palbusi and Wala. Its western neighbours are Vano, Deboko, Panshiaw and Changburi. Damongo, the capital of the Savannah Region is 172 kilometres by road to the west of Kpalbe.

See also
North East Gonja District
Salaga North (Ghana parliament constituency)

References

External links and sources
 North East Gonja District Official website
 Palbe on Wikimapia.org

Populated places in the Savannah Region (Ghana)
Savannah Region (Ghana)